PV Cephei is variable star of Orion type located in the constellation of Cepheus at a distance of over 1600 light-years from Earth.

References

A-type main-sequence stars
Cephei, PV
Cepheus (constellation)
T Tauri stars
Emission-line stars